Timote "Tim" Taliai Manoa (born September 9, 1964) is a former professional American football player. He played fullback for four seasons in the National Football League for the Cleveland Browns and the Indianapolis Colts. He played collegiately at Penn State and was a member of both the 1986 national championship team.
Manoa was born in Tonga, but at age 10 moved to Hawaii where he discovered American football. He attended Kahuku High School from grades 7 to 9 before moving to Wexford, Pennsylvania. There he attended North Allegheny High
. Manoa was named a Parade All-American and was heavily recruited by several top college football programs, including West Virginia, Pitt, Hawaii, and Ohio State, before selecting Penn State.

After outstanding junior and senior seasons as part of Penn State's "Baby Bull Backfield" fullback tandem (with Steve Smith), Manoa was invited to the Hula Bowl, Senior Bowl, and the NFL Combine where his NFL draft stock rose steadily. He was selected in the 3rd round (#80) of the 1987 NFL Draft by the Browns. He would play 3 seasons in Cleveland under Marty Schottenheimer and Bud Carson before moving on for a final season with Indianapolis.

Manoa now teaches speed training at Rocky's Personalized Training in Boardman, Ohio.

References

Living people
American football fullbacks
Cleveland Browns players
Indianapolis Colts players
Penn State Nittany Lions football players
Players of American football from Pennsylvania
People from Allegheny County, Pennsylvania
Tongan emigrants to the United States
Tongan players of American football
1964 births